The Embezzler or variant may refer to:

 embezzler, a person who embezzles or engages in embezzlement
 The Embezzler (1914 film), an American silent short drama film
 The Embezzler (1954 film), a British crime film
 The Embezzler (1966 book), a book by Louis Auchincloss
 The Embezzler (1944 novel), a novel by James M. Cain
 The Embezzlers (1926 novel), a novel by Valentin Kataev
 "The Embezzler", a character from the 1913 film Bloodhounds of the North